Daniel Porter could refer to: 

Daniel Porter (pirate), 18th-century Caribbean pirate and trader
Dan Porter (1931–2017), American baseball player
Daniel J. Porter (born 1966), American businessman
D. P. Porter (Daniel Price Porter, 1835–1899), Mississippi lawyer and politician
Daniel Porter (born 1992), known professionally as Daniel Portman, Scottish actor

See also
Daniel Porter Jordan III (born 1964), American jurist